Michael Silvers is a sound editor who has often worked with Pixar. He has worked on nearly every Pixar feature film.

He has over 110 credits to his name.

Oscar history 
All of these films were for Best Sound Editing.

 74th Academy Awards-Nominated for Monsters, Inc.. Nomination shared with Gary Rydstrom. Lost to Pearl Harbor.
 76th Academy Awards-Nominated for Finding Nemo. Nomination shared with Gary Rydstrom. Lost to Master and Commander: The Far Side of the World.
 77th Academy Awards-The Incredibles. Shared with Randy Thom. Won.
 80th Academy Awards-Nominated for Ratatouille. Nominated shared with Randy Thom. Lost to The Bourne Ultimatum.
 82nd Academy Awards-Nominated for Up. Nomination shared with Tom Myers. Lost to The Hurt Locker.
 83rd Academy Awards-Nominated for Toy Story 3. Nomination shared with Tom Myers. Lost to Inception.

References

External links 
 

Sound editors
Living people
Best Sound Editing Academy Award winners
Year of birth missing (living people)
Pixar people
Emmy Award winners